, known as Dancing Stage Hottest Party in the European and Oceanic regions, is a video game released by Konami in 2007 and 2008 to several countries for the Wii console. Konami took the game beyond the traditional setup of Dance Dance Revolution by incorporating the Wii Remote and the standard dance pad into a full body motion game. It has two sequels, Dance Dance Revolution Hottest Party 2 and Dance Dance Revolution Hottest Party 3.

Unlike the previous release of Dance Dance Revolution on a Nintendo console, Dance Dance Revolution Mario Mix, Hottest Party was not a collaboration between Konami and Nintendo. It is not a sequel, but the GameCube accessories for Mario Mix are compatible with Hottest Party.

Gameplay

The Gameplay is largely unchanged from other Dance Dance Revolution games. However, the game features additional modes taking advantage of the hardware of the Wii. The game allows the integration of the Wii Remote into gameplay, where steps can be replaced by markers requiring a hand motion with the remote. Other step types include steps which must be hit twice.

Hottest Party includes a single player mode (Groove Circuit and free play), and Workout Mode. Free play gives the players a free choice of songs, which can be played in Sync mode (several players play the same chart, and only the lowest step judgment on each arrow will count), and Friendship mode (where the highest step judgment is counted). In Groove Circuit, players will play through venues and different groups of songs. At the end of each venue, a boss battle will start. There are challenges for each dance, as well. The game supports multiplayer which requires four dance mats for each player.

Music
The soundtrack of Dance Dance Revolution Hottest Party differs in the Japanese release. "B4U (The Acolyte Mix)", "Gonna Make You Sweat (Everybody Dance Now)", "Rhythm is a Dancer" and "Unappreciated" are only featured in the North American/European/Oceanic release. "B4U (Rising Sun Mix)", "Double Tornard", "Pluto the First" and "True♥Love (Clubstar's True Club Mix)" are included in their place. All of the Japanese exclusives except "B4U (Rising Sun Mix)" were made available in later DDR console releases, such as Hottest Party 3 and DDR 2010. "Lessons by DJ" in the Japanese release has Japanese language voice overs during the song, whereas all other releases have English voice overs.

Reception

The game has received generally mixed reviews. Many reviews agree the hand motions freshen the DDR experience and are a positive addition to the game.

References

External links
Dance Dance Revolution Hottest Party teaser site
Dance Dance Revolution Hottest Party official site 
Dance Dance Revolution Online Community

2007 video games
Dance Dance Revolution games
Video games developed in Germany
Video games developed in Japan
Video games developed in the United States
Wii-only games
Wii games